Jørgen Horn (born 7 June 1987) is a Norwegian footballer. He currently plays for Norwegian club Sarpsborg 08.

Career statistics

Honours

Club
Strømsgodset
Tippeligaen (1): 2013

References

1987 births
Living people
Footballers from Oslo
Norwegian footballers
Norwegian expatriate footballers
Norway international footballers
Norway under-21 international footballers
Kjelsås Fotball players
Vålerenga Fotball players
Moss FK players
Viking FK players
Fredrikstad FK players
Strømsgodset Toppfotball players
IF Elfsborg players
Sarpsborg 08 FF players
Allsvenskan players
Eliteserien players
Norwegian First Division players
Expatriate footballers in Sweden
Norwegian expatriate sportspeople in Sweden
Association football defenders